The Beverley Sisters (MBE) were an English female close harmony pop vocal and light entertainment trio, consisting of three siblings from London. They were most popular during the 1950s and 1960s, and  became well-known through their radio and television appearances. They also toured the cabaret circuit. They were also known for their matching outfits, which they wore both on- and off-stage.

The Beverleys consisted of eldest sister Joy (born Joycelyn Victoria Chinery, 5 May 1924 – 31 August 2015), and twins Teddie (born Hazel P. Chinery, 5 May 1927) and Babs (born Babette Patricia Chinery, 5 May 1927 – 28 October 2018)
 
Their style was loosely modelled on that of their American counterparts,  The Andrews Sisters. Their notable successes included the Irving Berlin-penned  "Sisters" and the Christmas songs "I Saw Mommy Kissing Santa Claus", "Little Donkey", and "Little Drummer Boy", while in the United States they charted with a version of Greensleeves

Career
The sisters were born in Bethnal Green, London to Victoria Alice Miles and George Arthur Chinery (married 1916), who were known as the music hall act Coram and Mills, and are related to the Lupino acting and performing family.

The eldest, Joy, was born on 5 May 1924; the twins, Babs and Teddie, were born on Joy's third birthday, 5 May 1927. They were evacuated to Northampton during the Second World War, and, after starting work as typists, auditioned successfully to take part in an advertising campaign for the malt drink Ovaltine.

Photographer Jock Ware encouraged them to audition for BBC Radio. They did so in November 1944, changing their name to the Beverley Sisters on the advice of BBC producer Cecil Madden, who became their manager. They met Glenn Miller who, shortly before his disappearance, offered them the opportunity to record with members of his orchestra. They first appeared in programmes for the Allied Expeditionary Forces, recorded in Bedford.

Immediately after the war they toured with Eric Winstone and his Orchestra, and began making regular appearances on the BBC's early television programmes. They also performed for NBC in the US with surviving members of the Glenn Miller Orchestra. After their return to Britain, promoter Val Parnell booked them to appear at the London Palladium with Gracie Fields; although Fields refused, without explanation, to appear with them, the following year they performed with Danny Kaye. The BBC gave them their own television series, initially called Three Little Girls on View but later renamed as Those Beverley Sisters, which ran for seven years and on which they gave live performances of popular songs of the day.

In 1951 they signed a recording deal with the UK Columbia record label, later moving to the Philips and Decca labels before returning to Columbia in 1960. Their biggest hits on the UK singles chart were versions of "I Saw Mommy Kissing Santa Claus" (no.6, 1953) and "Little Drummer Boy" (no.6, 1959), which were both Christmas hits. The Beverley Sisters appeared as themselves in the 1954 British film musical Harmony Lane directed by Lewis Gilbert. 
In 1956, their version of the traditional song "Greensleeves", orchestrated by Roland Shaw, became their only US chart hit, reaching no.41 on the Billboard pop chart. Generally preferring live cabaret and television appearances over recording work, the song "Sisters", written by Irving Berlin and originally recorded in 1954 by Rosemary Clooney and her sister Betty, became their theme song; it has been claimed that Berlin wrote the song for the Beverley Sisters.

The sisters are widely credited as having been the highest paid female entertainers in the UK for more than 20 years. In 1952, 1958 and 1978, they appeared at the Royal Variety Performance.  In January 1961, they appeared on the radio show, Desert Island Discs. They appeared on the television show Stars on Sunday.  They were the subjects of This Is Your Life in 1969 when they were surprised by Eamonn Andrews.

Their career was revitalised in the 1980s, after their children – who had begun performing together as the Foxes – invited them onstage at the London Hippodrome, encouraged by club owner Peter Stringfellow. The three sisters began performing again for British troops, as well as in gay clubs in Britain, and they produced a new album, Sparkle. They also appeared in 1977 on the BBC TV's long running variety show The Good Old Days.

They performed as part of the Queen's Golden Jubilee celebrations in 2002, and toured with Max Bygraves that year, the 50th anniversary of their appearance at the Royal Variety Performance. They also took part in the D-Day 60th anniversary memorial concerts in 2004.

The sisters entered the Guinness World Records in 2002, as the world's longest surviving vocal group without a change in the original line up. As late as 2009, the sisters appeared in concerts and matinee shows in the United Kingdom. They forged links with the Burma Star Association, as well as McCarthy & Stone, where the sisters were invited to open each new housing development designed specifically for retired people. They later fully retired and lived near each other in Barnet.

Personal lives and honours
After a brief early marriage to American musician Roger Carocari (who adopted the surname Carey), later dissolved, Joy married the Wolverhampton Wanderers and England football captain Billy Wright on 28 July 1958 at Poole Register Office, a year before he retired as a player. They were married for 36 years until Wright died of cancer in September 1994. Joy died on 31 August 2015 at the age of 91. Babs married Scottish dentist James Mitchell in 1963 but the marriage did not last. She died on 28 October 2018, also at the age of 91, leaving no children. Teddie married the British waterskiing champion Peter Felix and is the last surviving sister.

In the 2006 New Year Honours list the sisters were each awarded an MBE.

Discography

Chart singles

Albums
 A Date with the Bevs (Philips, 1955)
 The Enchanting Beverley Sisters (Columbia, 1960)
 Those Beverley Sisters (Decca, 1960)
 The World of the Beverley Sisters (Decca, 1961)
 Together (EMI, 1985)
 Sparkle (K-Tel, 1985)
 Sisters, Sisters: An Evening with the Beverley Sisters (Pickwick, 1993)
 Bless 'Em All (Pickwick, 1995)

See also
List of Decca Records artists

Notes

References

English girl groups
British musical trios
English vocal groups
Family musical groups
Members of the Order of the British Empire
People from Bethnal Green
Sibling musical trios
Lupino family
Female-fronted musical groups